The term 2-lane expressway may refer to 2 similar grades of highway:

 Super two
 Two-lane expressway